Calvo may refer to

Calvo (surname)
Calvo, Cumbria, a hamlet in England
Luis Calvo, a Bolivian province
Porto Calvo, a Brazilian municipality
Calvo Doctrine, a foreign policy doctrine
Grupo Calvo, a group of Spanish companies dedicated to fishing, processing, and distribution of canned goods